Petra Marieke Sijpesteijn (born 2 February 1971, Naarden) is professor of Arabic at Leiden University. She was the founding president of the International Society for Arabic Papyrology.

Early life
Sijpesteijn received her MA from Leiden University and her PhD from Princeton University where she won the annual departmental prize for best thesis in 2004.

Career
Sijpesteijn was the founding president of the International Society for Arabic Papyrology (2001-2014). She is currently professor of Arabic at Leiden University.

She is a member of the Editorial Board for Journal of Ancient History.

Selected publications
Sijpesteijn P.M. (2015), A Ḥadīth Fragment on Papyrus, Der Islam: Journal of the History and Culture of the Middle East 92(2): 321-331.
Sijpesteijn P.M, Montgomery J.E. & Gelder G.J. van (2015), Wit and Wisdom in Classical Arabic Literature. Leiden Lectures on Arabic Language and Culture. Leiden: Leiden University Press.
Sijpesteijn P.M. (2014), Financial Troubles: A Mamluk Petition. In: Franklin A., Margariti R., Rustow M., Simonsohn U. (Eds.) Jews, Christians and Muslims in Medieval and Early Modern Times. A Festschrift in Honor of Mark R. Cohen Christians and Jews in Muslim Societies no. 2. Leiden: E.J. Brill. 352-366.
Sijpesteijn P.M. (2014), Financial Troubles: A Mamluk Petition. In: Franklin A.E., Margariti R.E., Rustow M., Simonsohn U. (Eds.) Jews, Christians and Muslims in Medieval and Early Modern Times. A Festschrift in Honor of Mark R. Cohen Christians and Jews in Muslim Societies no. 2. Leiden: Brill. 352-366.
Sijpesteijn P.M. (2014), Making the Private Public: a Delivery of Palestinian Oil in Third/Ninth-Century Egypt, Studia Orientalia Electronica 2: 74-91.
Sijpesteijn P.M. (2014), An Early Umayyad Papyrus Invitation for the Ḥajj, Journal of Near Eastern Studies 73: 179-190.
Sijpesteijn P.M. (2014), Locating Arabic Papyrology: Fiscal politics in medieval Egypt as a test-case for setting disciplinary boundaries and standards, The Bulletin of the American Society of Papyrologists 51: 217-228.
Sijpesteijn P.M. (2013), Shaping a Muslim State: The World of a Mid-Eighth-Century Egyptian Official. Oxford: Oxford University Press.
Sijpesteijn P.M. (2012), Coptic and Arabic Papyri from Deir al-Balā’izah. In: Schubert P. (Ed.) Actes du 26e Congrès international de papyrologie (Genève 2010). Geneva: Droz. 707-714.
Sijpesteijn P.M. (2012), Seals and Papyri from Early Islamic Egypt. In: Regulski I, Duistermaat K, Verkinderen P (Eds.) Seals and Sealing Practices in the Near East. Developments in Administration and Magic from Prehistory to the Islamic Period. Louvain: Peeters. 171-182.
Sijpesteijn P.M. (2012), An Arabic Land Lease from Ṭuṭūn. In: Ast R., Cuvigny H., Hickey, T. (Eds.) Papyrological Texts in Honor of Roger S. Bagnall no. 53. Durham NC: American Society of Papyrologists. 101-106.
Sijpesteijn P.M. (2012), Nessana. In: Wiley-Blackwell's Encyclopedia of Ancient History. Oxford.
Sijpesteijn P.M. (2012), Why Arabic?. Leiden: Leiden University Press.
Sijpesteijn P.M. (2012), Taking Care of the Weak An Arabic Papyrus from the Tropenmuseum, Amsterdam. In: Minutoli D. (Ed.) Inediti offerti a Rosario Pintaudi per il 65° compleanno (P.Pintaudi). Florence: Edizioni Gonnelli. 289-294.
Sijpesteijn P.M. (2011), Building an Egyptian Identity. In: Ahmed A Q., Bonner M., Sadeghi B. (Eds.) The Islamic Scholarly Tradition: Studies in History, Law, and Thought in Honor of Professor Michael Allen Cook. Leiden: E. J. Brill. 85-106.
Sijpesteijn P.M. (2011), Une nouvelle lettre de Qurra b. Šarīk. P.Sorb. inv. 2345, Annales Islamologiques 45: 257-267.
Sijpesteijn P.M., Margariti R. & Sabra A. (Eds.) (2011), Studies in the Social and Economic History of the Medieval Middle East. Essays in Honor of A.L. Udovitch. Leiden: Brill.
Sijpesteijn P.M. (2011), Army Economics: An Early Papyrus Letter Related to ‘Aṭā’ Payments. In: Margarati R., Sabra A., Sijpesteijn P.M. (Eds.) Histories of the Middle East Studies in Middle Eastern Society, Economy and Law in Honor of A.L. Udovitch. Leiden: E. J. Brill. 245-268.
Sijpesteijn P.M. (2010), Muhammad. In: Wiley-Blackwell's Encyclopedia of Ancient History. Oxford.
Sijpesteijn P.M. (2010), Barabra. In: Encyclopaedia of Islam 3. Leiden: E.J. Brill.
Sijpesteijn P.M. (2010), Hijra. In: Wiley-Blackwell's Encyclopedia of Ancient History. Oxford.
Sijpesteijn P.M. (2010), Arabic-Greek Archives. In: Papaconstantinou A. (Ed.) The Multilingual Experience in Egypt, from the Ptolemies to the 'Abbasids. Burlington: Ashgate. 105-126.
Sijpesteijn P.M. (2010), Quran. In: Wiley-Blackwell's Encyclopedia of Ancient History. Oxford.
Sijpesteijn P.M. (2010), Baqt. In: Encyclopaedia of Islam 3. Leiden: E.J. Brill.
Sijpesteijn P.M. (2010), North American Papyrus Collections Revisited, Al-Bardiyyat 1: 5-18.
Sijpesteijn P.M. (2010), Akhmim. In: Encyclopaedia of Islam 3. Leiden: E.J. Brill. 56-58.
Sijpesteijn P.M. (2009), Landholding Patterns in Early Islamic Egypt, Journal of Agrarian Change(9): 120-133.
Sijpesteijn P.M. (2009), A Mid-Eighth-Century Trilingual Tax Demand to a Bawit Monk. In: Boud'hors A., Clackson J., Louis C, Sijpesteijn P.M. (Eds.) The Administration of Monastic Estates in Late Antique and Early Islamic Egypt. Oxford. 102-119.
Sijpesteijn P.M. (2009), Arabic Papyri and Islamic Egypt. In: Bagnall R.S. (Ed.) Oxford Handbook of Papyrology. Oxford: Oxford University Press. 452-472.
Sijpesteijn P.M., Boud’hors A., Clackson J. & Louis C. (Eds.) (2009), Monastic Estates in Late Antique and Early Islamic Egypt: Ostraca, Papyri, and Studies in Honour of Sarah Clackson. Durham, NC: The American Society of Papyrologists.
Sijpesteijn P.M. (2008), A Seventh/Eighth-Century List of Companions from Fustat. In: Muhs B., Hogendijk C. (Eds.) Sixty-Five Papyrological Texts Presented to Klaas A. Worp on the Occasion of his 65th Birthday. Leiden: E.J. Brill. 369-377.
Sijpesteijn P.M. (2007), The Arab Conquest of Egypt and the Beginning of Muslim Rule. In: Bagnall R.S. (Ed.) Byzantine Egypt. Cambridge: Cambridge University Press. 437-459.
Sijpesteijn P.M. (2007), Arabic Papyri from Current Excavations in Egypt, Al-Bardiyyat(2): 10-23.
Sijpesteijn P.M. (2007), Palaeography. In: Versteegh C. (Ed.) Encyclopedia of Arabic Language and 
Sijpesteijn P.M. (2007), Creating a Muslim State: The Collection and Meaning of Sadaqa. In: Palme B. (Ed.) Akten des 23. internationalen Papyrologenkongresses Wien, 22.-28. Juli 2001. Vienna. 661-674.
Sijpesteijn P.M. (2007), New Rule over Old Structures: Egypt after the Muslim Conquest. In: Crawford H. (Ed.) Regime Change in the Ancient Near East and Egypt: From Sargon of Agade to the Seljuks. Proceedings of the British Academy. London: British Academy Publications. 183-202.
Sijpesteijn P.M. (2006), Veroveren met verhalen. In: Hoftijzer P., Van Ommen K., Witkam J.J. (Eds.) Bronnen en Kennis. Leiden: Scaliger Institute Publications. 17-22.
Sijpesteijn P.M. (2006), The Archival Mind in Early Islamic Egypt: Two Arabic Papyri. In: *Sijpesteijn P.M., Sundelin L., Torallas Tovar S., Zomeno A. (Eds.) From al-Andalus to Khurasan: Documents from the Medieval Muslim World. Leiden: E.J. Brill. 163-187.
Sijpesteijn P.M., Sundelin L., Torallas Tovar S. & Zomeno A. (Eds.) (2006), From al-Andalus to Khurasan: Documents from the Medieval Muslim World. Leiden: E.J. Brill.
Sijpesteijn P.M., Oates J.F. & Kaplony A. (2005), Checklist of Editions of Arabic Papyri, The Bulletin of the American Society of Papyrologists 42: 127-166.
Sijpesteijn P.M. & Sundelin L. (Eds.) (2004), Papyrology and the History of Early Islamic Egypt. Leiden: E. J. Brill.
Sijpesteijn P.M. (2004), A Request to Buy Silk from Early Islamic Egypt. In: Harrauer H., Pintaudi R. (Eds.) Gedenkschrift Ulrike Horak. Papyrologica Florentina XXXIV. Florence: Edizioni Gonelli. 255-272.
Sijpesteijn P.M. (2004), Travel and Trade on the River. In: Sijpesteijn P.M., Sundelin L. (Eds.) Papyrology and the History of Early Islamic Egypt.. Leiden: E.J. Brill. 115-152.
Sijpesteijn P.M. (2001), Profit Following Responsibility: A Leaf from the Records of a Third-Century Tax-Collecting Agent. With an Appended Checklist of Editions of Arabic Papyri, Journal of Juristic Papyrology 31: 91-132.

References 

1971 births
Living people
Dutch Arabists

Dutch orientalists

Linguists from the Netherlands
Papyrologists
Leiden University alumni
Academic staff of Leiden University
Princeton University alumni
People from Naarden